Mother Carey's Chickens is a 1938 drama film starring Anne Shirley and Ruby Keeler. The film was directed by Rowland V. Lee and based upon a 1917 play by Kate Douglas Wiggin and Rachel Crothers, which in turn was adapted from Wiggins' Mother Carey's Chickens.

Originally Katharine Hepburn was assigned to the lead role. She refused, however, and left RKO in order to avoid having to appear in the film.

In 1963, Walt Disney released Summer Magic, a loose remake of this film, with Hayley Mills as Nancy Carey.

Plot
Mr. Carey, a captain in the United States Navy, dies during the Spanish–American War. His wife Margaret, daughters Nancy and Kitty and sons Gilbert and Peter are left behind. They are now on their own with only Capt. Carey's pension for income. The family moves into a series of ever-smaller rented houses while Mrs. Carey works in a textile mill. When she is injured, they lease a broken down mansion for a year at a nominal fee, and invest the captain's small life insurance payment to fix it up into a boarding house. Both daughters fall in love, Kitty with a local teacher and Nancy with Tom Hamilton, the son of the absentee owner.

When the Hamiltons put the house up for sale, the family is given an eviction order by Tom Hamilton, a doctor who wants the money from the sale to study in Europe. However, fate intervenes and Tom is called to save Peter from a serious illness, then falls in love with Nancy. The new owners, the Fullers, move in to force the family to vacate. The Careys and their beaus then try to scare off the Fullers by telling them the house is haunted, and making assorted spooky noises at night, hoping they will leave.

Cast

Reception
The film earned a profit of $110,000.

References

External links 
 

1938 films
American black-and-white films
1938 drama films
American drama films
Films based on American novels
Films directed by Rowland V. Lee
Films based on works by Kate Douglas Wiggin
1930s American films
1930s English-language films